Bruny Nsimba (born 5 April 2000) is an Angolan professional footballer who plays as a winger for Beveren.

Professional career
Nsimba made his professional debut with Antwerp in the 2020 Belgian Cup Final, a 1–0 win over Club Brugge on 1 August 2020. On 20 October 2020, Nsimba signed his first professional contract with Antwerp for 3 years.

On 31 January 2023, Nsimba moved to Beveren.

Personal life
Nsimba was born in Angola to a Congolese father and Angolan mother, and moved to Belgium at the age of 2.

Honours
Antwerp
Belgian Cup: 2019–20

References

External links
 
 Antwerp Supporter Profile

2000 births
Angolan people of Democratic Republic of the Congo descent
Angolan emigrants to Belgium
Living people
Angolan footballers
Belgian footballers
Association football wingers
Royal Antwerp F.C. players
S.K. Beveren players
Belgian Pro League players